This is a list of the main career statistics of professional Romanian tennis player Irina-Camelia Begu.

Performance timelines 

Only main-draw results in WTA Tour, Grand Slam tournaments, Fed Cup/Billie Jean King Cup and Olympic Games are included in win–loss records.

Singles 
Current after the 2023 Indian Wells Open.

Doubles 
Current after the 2023 Australian Open.

Significant finals

Premier Mandatory/Premier 5 finals

Doubles: 1 (1 runner-up)

WTA career finals

Singles: 9 (5 titles, 4 runner-ups)

Doubles: 16 (9 titles, 7 runner-ups)

WTA Challenger finals

Singles: 2 (2 titles)

ITF Circuit finals

Singles: 20 (12 titles, 8 runner–ups)

Doubles: 27 (19 titles, 8 runner–ups)

WTA Tour career earnings
Current through the 2022 US Open

Career Grand Slam statistics

Grand Slam seedings
The tournaments won by Begu are in boldface, and advanced into finals by Begu are in italics.

Record against other players

Record against top 10 players 
Begu's record against players who have been ranked in the top 10. Active players are in boldface.

Top 10 wins

Awards 

 2011

 WTA Newcomer of the Year

Notes

References 

Begu, Irina-Camelia